The Judo World Masters is an annual invite-only judo competition. After being open for only the top 16 ranked judoka in each weight class for its first eight installments, the tournament was expended to host the top 36 of each weight class in 2019. The world masters is the only world tour event with no limitation on the number of judoka competing from any single national association.

Competitions

Points
As in any IJF World Tour tournament, athletes earn WRL points by competing in IJF World Masters events. points are awarded based on judoka placement in the competition.

References

 
World Masters
World Masters
Recurring sporting events established in 2010